Xiaoba may refer to these locations in China:

Xiaoba Township (小坝乡), a township in Huidong County, Sichuan
Xiaoba Subdistrict (肖坝街道), a subdistrict of Shizhong District, Leshan, Sichuan

Towns
Xiaoba, Guizhou (小坝), in Bijie, Guizhou
Xiaoba, Ningxia (小坝), in Qingtongxia, Ningxia
Xiaoba, Anzhou District (晓坝), in Anzhou District, Mianyang, Sichuan
Xiaoba, Beichuan County (小坝), in Beichuan Qiang Autonomous County, Mianyang, Sichuan